Guinea-Bissau made its Paralympic Games début at the 2012 Summer Paralympics in London, sending two T46 classified athletes to compete in track events.

Guinea-Bissau has never taken part in the Winter Paralympic Games, and no Bissau-Guinean athlete has ever won a Paralympic medal.

Full results for Guinea-Bissau at the Paralympics

See also
 Guinea-Bissau at the Olympics

References